Neoveitchia storckii is a species of palm tree. It is native to Fiji. It grows in rainforests and is endangered by habitat loss.

References

External links
 PACSOA description

storckii
Endemic flora of Fiji
Trees of Fiji
Endangered plants
Taxa named by Odoardo Beccari
Taxonomy articles created by Polbot